Banderilla is a municipality located in the central zone of the State of Veracruz, Mexico, about 9 km from the state capital, Xalapa. It has a surface area of 22.21 km2. Tradition has it that the name alludes to a small flag (banderilla) that thieves would hoist on the summit of the hill of La Martinica as a signal to their accomplices that a valuable goods were being moved along the royal highway.

Geographical limits
The municipality of Banderilla is delimited to the north and northeast by Jilotepec, to the east and the south by Xalapa, and to the southeast and west by Rafael Lucio. To the municipality it is watered by tributary rivers of the Sedeño River, which in turn is a tributary of the Actopan River.

Agriculture

It produces principally maize, sugarcane and coffee.

Celebrations

In  Banderilla , in March takes place the celebration in honor to San José, Patron of the town, and in December takes place the celebration in honor to Virgen de Guadalupe.

Weather

The weather in  Banderilla  is cold and wet all year with rains in summer and autumn.

References

External links 

  Municipal Official webpage
  Municipal Official Information

Municipalities of Veracruz